José Carvalhosa (1 March 1911 – 14 May 1991) was a Portuguese equestrian. He competed in two events at the 1952 Summer Olympics.

References

1911 births
1991 deaths
Portuguese male equestrians
Olympic equestrians of Portugal
Equestrians at the 1952 Summer Olympics
Place of birth missing